Royal American can refer to:

 Royal American Magazine (The Royal American Magazine, or Universal Repository of Instruction and Amusement), (January 1774 - March 1775), a short-lived monthly periodical published in Boston, Massachusetts
 Royal American Regiment, see King's Royal Rifle Corps, a British Army infantry regiment raised in colonial North America
 Royal American Shows, an American travelling carnival company operating from the 1920s to the 1990s

See also

 American Royal, a livestock show, horse show and rodeo held each year in October and November at Kemper Arena, Kansas City, Missouri

American (disambiguation)
Royal (disambiguation)